Saint-Jean-d'Arvey (Arpitan: Sant-Jian-d'Arvê) is a commune in the Savoie department in the Auvergne-Rhône-Alpes region in Southeastern France. It is part of the urban area of Chambéry. In 2019, it had a population of 1,726.

See also
Communes of the Savoie department

References

Communes of Savoie